The World Monuments Watch is a flagship advocacy program of the New York-based private non-profit organization World Monuments Fund (WMF) that is dedicated to preserving the historic, artistic, and architectural heritage around the world.

Selection process
Every two years, it publishes a select list known as the Watch List of 100 Most Endangered Sites that is in urgent need of preservation funding and protection. It is a call to action on behalf of threatened cultural heritage monuments worldwide. The sites are nominated by governments, conservation professionals, site caretakers, non-government organizations (NGOs), concerned individuals, and others working in the field. An independent panel of international experts then select 100 candidates from these entries to be part of the Watch List, based on the significance of the sites, the urgency of the threat, and the viability of both advocacy and conservation solutions. A site’s inclusion on the Watch List attracts international attention, helping to raise funds needed for its rescue and spurring local governments and communities to take an active role in protecting the cultural landmark.

2004 Watch List
The 2004 World Monuments Watch List of 100 Most Endangered Sites was launched on 24 September 2003 by WMF President Bonnie Burnham and WMF partner American Express. For the first time, a site from Antarctica was included, ensuring that the Watch List geographically covers every continent.

List by country/territory

Statistics by country/territory
The following countries/territories have multiple sites entered on the 2004 Watch List, listed by the number of sites:

Notes

A. Numbers list only meant as a guide on this article. No official reference numbers have been designated for the sites on the Watch List.
B. Names and spellings used for the sites were based on the official 2004 Watch List as published.
C. The references to the sites' locations were based on the official 2004 Watch List as published.
D. Tally includes the transfrontier site of Jesuit Guaraní Missions.

References

External links
 World Monuments Fund home page
 World Monuments Watch home page

Historic preservation
2004 works